

Robert of Chichester (died before April 1161) was a medieval Bishop of Exeter.

Robert is often confused with his predecessor, Robert Warelwast. His surname comes from a single source, one of his successors. He was a relative of David fitzGerald, bishop of St David's, but the exact relationship is unknown. He held a prebend at Islington in the diocese of London, and was dean of Salisbury from 1148. He was consecrated on 5 June 1155 or perhaps on 3 June.

John of Salisbury felt that Robert gained the bishopric by simony, and his rule seems to have been unpopular. He brought in a number of clergy from the diocese of Salisbury, and acted as a patron to his successor Bartholomew Iscanus as well as Baldwin of Exeter, who was later to become Archbishop of Canterbury.

Robert died on 10 March 1160 according to the Handbook of British Chronology, but other sources just say he died before 18 April 1161. His burial site is unknown.

Citations

References

External links
 "Entry for Robert" in George Oliver's Lives of the Bishops of Exeter

Bishops of Exeter
12th-century English Roman Catholic bishops
1160 deaths
Deans of Salisbury
Year of birth unknown